Teatro is the 2nd live album recorded by Puerto Rican singer Draco Rosa released on September 23, 2008. The album won the Latin Grammy Award for Best Rock Solo Vocal Album.

Track listing

2008 live albums
Latin Grammy Award for Best Rock Solo Vocal Album
Draco Rosa live albums
Spanish-language live albums